Thomas James Montgomery Priestley (11 March 1911 – 28 July 1985) was a Northern Irish footballer who played at both professional and international levels as a striker.

Personal life
Born in Belfast, Priestly wore a rugby-style skull cap to cover his premature baldness.

Career

Club career
Priestley began his senior career with Coleraine in 1928, after moving there from Cookstown. Priestley moved to Linfield in 1932, before signing with English side Chelsea just a year later. Priestley only spent one season with Chelsea - making 23 appearances in The Football League - before returning to Ireland with Shelbourne.

International career
Priestley earned two caps for Ireland between 1932 and 1933.

References

External links
NIFG

1911 births
1985 deaths
Association footballers from Northern Ireland
Pre-1950 IFA international footballers
Coleraine F.C. players
Linfield F.C. players
Chelsea F.C. players
Shelbourne F.C. players
English Football League players
Association football forwards